William the Pirate is the fourteenth book in the Just William series by Richmal Crompton. It was first published in 1932. It contains eleven short-stories, one of which (Aunt Arabelle in Charge) features the odious "Anthony Martin" who is often cited as a parody of A.A. Milne's Christopher Robin.

The Stories
William and the Musician William helps an Italian puppeteer to return to his native land and accidentally supports Mrs Bott's house party.
William Holds the Stage William is determined to play the part of Hamlet in a school theatrical performance to win Dorinda Lane's praise.
The Outlaws and the Triplets Henry is forced to look after his baby sister and when the Outlaws lose her, things get complicated..
William and the Eastern Curse William helps a girl to choose her ideal husband between two men.
The New Neighbour William takes ingenious revenge on his aggressive next-door neighbour.
Mrs Bott's Hat Bizarre circumstances force William to pose as a female circus dwarf to return a flamboyant hat to Mrs Bott.
William and the Princess Goldilocks William falls in love with an actress he sees in a stage play. He sets out to find her but she is not all she seems.
Their Good Resolution Wanting a more exciting New Year's Resolution, the Outlaws decide to start "rescuing people".
William's Invention Mrs. Bott tries to convince a journalist that her house is haunted, and with William's accidental help succeeds.
Aunt Arabelle in Charge With absent-minded Aunt Arabelle in charge, the Outlaws have the run of Ginger's family home. However, this leads to unexpected problems when a child star stays in the village. (This story is notable for featuring "Anthony Martin", a thinly disguised parody of Christopher Robin Milne, son of A.A. Milne.)
A Little Affair of Rivalry Robert is infatuated with a newly arrived beauty, but he soon finds he has a rival!

1932 short story collections
Just William
Short story collections by Richmal Crompton
Children's short story collections
1932 children's books
George Newnes Ltd books